This is a list of the deputies of the Italian Chamber of Deputies that were elected in the 1983 general election to the IX Legislature.

Political groups 

The number of representatives for each group at the beginning of the legislative term takes into account the substitute deputies who were elected by 10 August 1983.

Office of the President

President 

 Nilde Iotti (PCI)

Vice Presidents 

 Oscar Luigi Scalfaro (DC) (resigned on 4 August 1983)
 Giuseppe Azzaro (DC) (elected on 29 September 1983)
 Oddo Biasini (PRI)
 Aldo Aniasi (PSI)
 Vito Lattanzio (DC)

Quaestors 

  (DC) (resigned on 21 December 1983)
 Luciano Radi (DC) (elected on 19 January 1984)
  (PSI)
  (PCI) (resigned on 17 July 1986)
  (PCI) (elected on 17 July 1986)

Secretaries 

  (PCI)
  (Sin.Ind.)
  (PSI)
  (DC)
 Renzo Patria (DC)
 Egidio Sterpa (PLI)
  (MSI-DN)
 Giuseppe Amadei (PSDI) (resigned on 28 November 1984)
  (PSDI) (elected on 28 November 1984)

Composition

Changes in composition

Changes in the legislature

Changes in political parties

Christian Democracy 

 On 31 May 1985,  joined the Christian Democracy from the PSDI.

Italian Communist Party 

 On 2 February 1984,  left the PCI to join the mixed group.
 On 24 May 1984,  joined the PCI to replace Luciana Castellina, a member of the PdUP.
 On 1 December 1984, Famiano Crucianelli, Lucio Magri and  joined the PCI from the PdUP.

Italian Socialist Party 

 On 16 April 1986, Francesco Roccella joined the PSI from the mixed group.

Italian Democratic Socialist Party 

 On 31 May 1985,  left the PSDI to join the DC.

Radical Party 

 On 28 February 1986, Francesco Roccella left the PR to join the mixed group.
 On 5 March 1986,  left the PR to join the mixed group.

Mixed Groups 

 On 2 February 1984,  joined the mixed group from the PCI.
 On 23 May 1984, Luciana Castellina of the PdUP left office and his successor, joined the PCI.
 On 28 February 1986, Francesco Roccella joined the mixed group from the PR.
 On 5 March 1986,  joined the mixed group from the PR.
 On 16 April 1986, Francesco Roccella left the mixed group for the PSI.

References 

Deputies of Legislature IX of Italy